The Treason Act 1495, formally referred as the Act 11 Hen 7 c 1 and informally as the  statute, is an Act of the Parliament of England which was passed in the reign of Henry VII of England.

Background 
After the defeat of Richard III in the Battle of Bosworth on 22 August 1485, Henry VII was crowned King of England. However, Henry VII backdated the start of his reign to 21 August, the day before the battle, which enabled him to prosecute anyone who had fought under his rival and execute them for treason. 

This was highly controversial, since it meant that anyone who fought for the rightful king against a usurper would be at risk of execution if they lost, and might undermine their courage and loyalty. Nevertheless, Henry VII had his way as the Parliament of England was in no position to oppose him, although later that year a general pardon was issued to those who had fought for Richard III.

However, in 1495, Henry VII's position on the throne was sufficiently secure that he could afford to allow Parliament to pass a bill to prevent the treason laws from being abused in this way.

The Act 
The Act states that a person serving the king de facto for the time being is not guilty of treason, or of any other offence, if he wages war against the king de jure. William Blackstone wrote that the Act is "declaratory of the common law."

Legacy 
In 1662, the Act was cited by Sir Harry Vane in his treason trial following the Restoration. He was one of those accused of serving with Oliver Cromwell against the king during the English Civil War, and in his defence he relied upon the Act. However the court ruled that the Act was only intended to protect those who fought for a king, not to protect rebels who fought to abolish the monarchy. He was convicted and executed.

The Act is still in force today, and was applied to Scotland following the passage of the Treason Act 1708.

Other countries
In New Zealand, the Crimes Act 1961 provides that obedience to the laws of a person with "possession de facto of the sovereign power" is protected from criminal responsibility.

See also
High treason in the United Kingdom
Treason Act

References

Citations

Notes 

Acts of the Parliament of England (1485–1603)
Acts of the Parliament of England still in force
1490s in law
1495 in England
Treason in England
English criminal law